Thomas Dickerson (22 May 1889 – 2 July 1970) was a South African cricketer. He played in one first-class match for Border in 1920/21.

See also
 List of Border representative cricketers

References

External links
 

1889 births
1970 deaths
South African cricketers
Border cricketers
Cricketers from East London, Eastern Cape